The Birmingham Power was one of the original franchises of the National Women's Basketball League (NWBL).  Based in Birmingham, Alabama, they played from 2001 to 2005.

External links
BirminghamProSports.com
NWBL website (archive link)

Basketball teams in Alabama
Sports teams in Birmingham, Alabama
Women's sports in Alabama